Balyan may refer to:

 Balyan family, an Armenian family of Ottoman court architects
 Balyan (surname), an Indian surname
 Balyan Rural District, in Fars province of Iran
 Balyan, Iran, a village in Balyan Rural District
 Balyan, shamans in the Philippines